Shahrak-e Sadra or Shahrak-e Sadara may refer to:
 Shahrak-e Sadra, Neyriz
 Shahrak-e Sadara, Shiraz